The 2022 Africa Magic Viewers' Choice Awards held on Saturday, 14 May 2022 at Eko Hotel and Suites in Lagos. It was set an 8-day event which started on Saturday, 7 May 2022, unlike previous 1 day events.

The nominees were revealed by actors Adesua Etomi-Wellington and Daniel Etim Effiong on Saturday 19 March 2022 in a ceremony. A total of 33 categories were announced, 12 of which are open to public voting. Best Online Social Content Creator was introduced as a new category.

The winner in the Best Soundtrack category won a ₦1 million prize.

Stan Nze and Osas Ighodaro won the award in the Best Actor and Best Actress in a drama respectively for their roles in Rattlesnake: The Ahanna Story. Ramsey Noah won the Best Director award for the same film. Other award winners include Funke Akindele and Broda Shaggi in the Best Actor and Best Actress in a comedy categories. Amina by Izu Ojukwu & Okey Ogunjiofor win the award for the best overall film.

Awards 
Winners are listed highlighted in boldface
{| class="wikitable"
! style="background:#EEDD82; width:50%" |Best Actress in A Comedy 
! style="background:#EEDD82; width:50%" |Best Actor in A Comedy
|-
| valign="top" |
 Funke Akindele - Omo Ghetto: The Saga 
 Bimbo Ademoye - Breaded Life 
 Bisola Aiyeola - Dwindle 
 Nancy Isime - Kambili: The Whole 30 Yards 
 Nse Nkpe Etim - Quams Money 
 Sarah Hassan - Just In Time 
| valign="top" |
 Broda Shaggi - Dwindle
 Deyemi Okanlawon - Omo Ghetto: The Saga 
 Femi Adebayo - Progressive Tailors Club 
 Gideon Okeke - Loving Rona 
 Shawn Faqua - Soole 
 Timini Egbuson - Ponzi 
 Williams Uchemba - Dear Affy 
|-
! style="background:#EEDD82; width:50%" |Best Supporting Actress
! style="background:#EEDD82; width:50%" |Best Supporting Actor
|-
| valign="top" |
 Omowunmi Dada - Country Hard
 Bisola Aiyeola - Sugar Rush 
 Chioma Chukwuka Akpotha - Omo Ghetto: The Saga 
 Clarion Chukwurah - Amina 
 Enado Odigie - The New Normal 
 Mercy Johnson - The New Normal 
 Mumbi Maina - La Femme Anjola 
| valign="top" |
 Odunlade Adekola - Jankariwo
 Adjete Anang - Gold Coast Lounge 
 Bucci Franklin - Rattlesnake: The Ahanna Story 
 Eric Roberts - A Soldier’s Story 
 Magaji Mijinyawa - Amina 
 Tope Tedela - Country Hard 
|-
! style="background:#EEDD82; width:50%" |Best Actress in A Drama
! style="background:#EEDD82; width:50%" |Best Actor in A Drama
|-
| valign="top" |
 Osas Ighodaro - Rattlesnake: The Ahanna Story
 Asabe Madaki - Voiceless 
 Bisola Aiyeola - This Lady Called Life 
 Genoveva Umeh - A Tune Away 
 Kehinde Bankole - Dear Affy 
 Meg Otanwa - For Maria Ebun Pataki 
 Nancy Isime - Superstar  
| valign="top" |
 Stan Nze - Rattlesnake: The Ahanna Story
 Efa Iwara - This Lady Called Life 
 Eyinna Nwigwe - Dear Affy 
 Femi Jacobs - Introducing the Kujus 
 Gabriel Afolayan - For Maria Ebun Pataki  
 Timini Egbuson - Introducing the Kujus 
|-
! style="background:#EEDD82; width:50%" |Best Short Film or Online Video
! style="background:#EEDD82; width:50%" |Best Indigenous Language – Yoruba
|-
| valign="top" |
 Taiwo Ogunnimo - I Am the Prostitute Mama Described 
 Abimbola Craig - Fractured
 Korede Olayinka - Kiitan 
 Mary Nsikanabasi Uyoh - Something About Zee 
 Nicholas ‘Big Ghun’ Nartey - Koro 
 Ozor Uche - Ounje Ale 
 Sandra Tetteh - Dices 
| valign="top" |
 David Akande, Demola Yusuf and Edgard Leroy - Alaise
 Bukunmi Oluwasina - Jankariwo  
 Olamide Akinmolayan - Balokun 
 Olapeju Wahab - Ijolewa 
 Samuel Oniyitan - Abeke 
 Wunmi Ajiboye - Arodan 
|-
! style="background:#EEDD82; width:50%" |Best Indigenous Language – Hausa
! style="background:#EEDD82; width:50%" |Best Indigenous Language – Igbo
|-
| valign="top" |
 Rogers Ofime - Voiceless
 Abdulkadir Nuhu Aminu - Tsangayar Asali 
 Abubakar Bashir Maishadda - Sarki Goma Zamani Goma 
 Abubakar Bashir Maishadda - Bana Bakwai 
 Diane Russet And Ayo Newo - Bayi  
| valign="top" |
 Uche Nnanna Maduka - Nne-Ka
 Oma Nnadi - Udene  
 Victor Iyke - Uhuruchi-Sunset 
 Victor Onwudiwe and Ugomma Onwe - Echezona 
|-
! style="background:#EEDD82; width:50%" |Best Indigenous Language – Swahili
! style="background:#EEDD82; width:50%" |Best Art Director
|-
| valign="top" |
 Obambo - Freddy Feruzi 
 Jaramandia - Dennis Humphrey, Bernard Kahindi 
 Rishai - Omar Hamza Hassan 

| valign="top" |
 Tunji Afolayan - Amina
 Adeoye Adetunji - Introducing the Kuju’s 
 Chima Adighije - One Lagos Night 
 Chris Udomi - Day of Destiny 
 Ediri Okwa - The Smart Money Woman 
 Mayowa Labiran - The Mystic River 
 Pat Nebo - Rattlesnake: The Ahanna Story  
|-
! style="background:#EEDD82; width:50%" |Best Costume Designer
! style="background:#EEDD82; width:50%" |Best Lighting Designer
|-
| valign="top" |
 Millicent T. Jack - Amina
 Funke Akindele Bello - Omo Ghetto: The Saga 
 Isoken Ogiemwonyi - The Smart Money Woman  
 Obijie Oru - The Mystic River 
 Titi Aina Raji - Voiceless 
 Yoanna ‘Pepper’ Chikezie - Nneka The Pretty Serpent 
 Yolanda Okereke - La Femme Anjola 
| valign="top" |
 Mathew Yusuf - Rattlesnake: The Ahanna Story
 Fei Mustapha - Dear Affy 
 Godwin Lawani - Light In The Dark 
 Jaco Strauss - The White Line  
 Mathew Yusuf - Nneka the Pretty Serpent 
 Stanley Ibegbu Okechukwu - Amina 
 Yemi Awoponle - The Mystic River 
|-
! style="background:#EEDD82; width:50%" |Best Picture Editor
! style="background:#EEDD82; width:50%" |Best Sound Editor
|-
| valign="top" |
Tunde Apalowo - For Maria Ebun Pataki
 Dolapo Adeleke - Just In Time 
 JJC Skillz, Adeyemi Shomade and Valentine Chukwuma - Omo Ghetto - The Saga
 Moses Inwang - Bad Comments 
 Rogers Ofime - Voiceless 
 Tega Salubi - Collision Course 
 Tester Bassey, Abiodun Okunola and Moses Inwang - Lockdown  
| valign="top" |
 Jim Lively and James Nelson - Amina
 Bayo Adepetun And Biola ‘Lala’ Olayinka - Prophetess 
 Habib Adebayo Olaore - Nneka the Pretty Serpent 
 Hassan Mageye - Tinka’s Story  
 Puffy Tee - Omo Ghetto: The Saga 
 Tom Koroluk - For Maria Ebun Pataki 
|-
! style="background:#EEDD82; width:50%" |Best Sound Track
! style="background:#EEDD82; width:50%" |Best Make Up
|-
| valign="top" |
 Pascal Aka And Raquel - Gold Coast Lounge
 Awele Mekwunye And Bizzouch - Light In The Dark 
 Boumeester Lindsay & Kagwe Mungai - Just In Time 
 Collision Course
 Dabs Agwom - Amina 
 Larry Gaaga - Rattlesnake: The Ahanna Story 
 Michael Pulse And Ponti Dikuua - The White Line  
| valign="top" |
 Balogun Abiodun - Omo Ghetto The Saga
 Abiola Popoola - La Femme Anjola 
 Adewunmi Fatai And Ayobami Abolarin - Peregun 
 Carina Ojoko - Rattlesnake: The Ahanna Story 
 Dagogo Diminas And Gabriel Okorie Gabazzini - Amina 
 Gift Ameh - Voiceless 
 Ugochinyere Ihendi - Nneka the Pretty Serpent 
|-
! style="background:#EEDD82; width:50%" |Best Writer
! style="background:#EEDD82; width:50%" |Best Cinematographer
|-
| valign="top" |
 Manie Oiseomaye, Donald Tombia and Biodun Stephen - Introducing the Kujus’ 
 Abosi Ogba, Sally Kenneth Dadzie, Lydia Idakula Sobogun, Olawale Adetula And Belinda Yanga Agedah - Little Black Book 
 Chigozirim Nwanegbo - One Lagos Night 
 Frank Chinedu Uba - Amina 
 Toluwani Obayan And Kayode Kasum - This Lady Called Life 
 Tunde Babalola - La Femme Anjola 
 Tunray Femi And Damilola E. Orimogunje - For Maria Ebun Pataki 
| valign="top" |
 Muhammed Atta Ahmed - Rattlesnake: The Ahanna Story
 Barnabas Emordi - Superstar 
 James Amuta - [[Collision Course - 2021 film|Collision Course]]  John Njaga Demps - Nneka the Pretty Serpent  
 Peter Kreil, Wale Adebayo, Samuel Jonathan and Moruf Fadaro - Amina  Samuel Jonathan And Moruf Fadaro - The Mystic River  Victoria Ombogo - Just In Time |-
! style="background:#EEDD82; width:50%" |Best Movie Southern Africa
! style="background:#EEDD82; width:50%" |Best Movie East Africa
|-
| valign="top" |
 Dantagos Jimmy-Melani - Hairareb 
 David Kazadi - Black Dollar  Dumie Manyathela - Veza – The Unfolding  Paul.S.Wilo - Maria Kristu | valign="top" |
 Morocco Omari & Loukman Ali - The Girl in the Yellow Jumper - Winner
 Ayeny T. Steve - Beautiful Ashes  Denise Kibisu Ngubuini - A Grand Little Lie  Ndagire Mariam - My Husband’s Wife  Raphael Emmanuel - Ugonwa Wa Kifo  Sarah Hassan And Dolapo Adeleke - Just In Time |-
! style="background:#EEDD82; width:50%" |Best Movie West Africa
! style="background:#EEDD82; width:50%" |Best Overall Movie
|-
| valign="top" |
 Bolanle Austen-Peter, Joseph Umoibom and James Amuta- Collision Course 
 Okey Ogunjiofor - Amina   Biodun Stephen and Tara Ajibulu - Breaded Life  Chris Odeh - Nneka The Pretty Serpent   Funke Akindele Bello and Jjc Skillz - Omo Ghetto: The Saga  Chris Odeh - Rattlesnake: The Ahanna Story  Orwi Manny Ameh - Tainted Canvas | valign="top" |
 Izu Ojukwu And Okey Ogunjiofor - Amina
 Bolanle Austen-Peters - Collision Course  Dolapo Adeleke And Sarah Hassan - Just In Time  
 Jjc Skillz And Funke Akindele Bello - Omo Ghetto: The Saga  Mildred Okwo And Rita Dominic - La Femme Anjola  Ramsey Nouah And Chris Odeh - Rattlesnake: The Ahanna Story  Robert O. Peters and Rogers Ofime - Voiceless  Tosin Igho And Chris Odeh - Nneka the Pretty Serpent |-
! style="background:#EEDD82; width:50%" |Best Television Series
! style="background:#EEDD82; width:50%" |The Multichoice Talent Factory
|-
| valign="top" |
 Rogers Ofime - The Mystic River
 Arese Ugwu/Isoken Ogiemwonyi/Lala Akindoju/ Akintunde Marine Marinho - The Smart Money Woman  Mwaka Nakweti - Bukutu  Olawale Adetula - Little Black Book  Olawale Adetula - My Name A-Zed  Olufunke Akindele - Jenifa’s Diary  
 Vincent Nwachukwu - Rumour Has It Season 3 | valign="top" |
 Daisy Masembe - Engaito
 Abisola Aboaba - Bride Untangled  Brian Ontiri - Rebirth  Christine Boateng And Eric Okyerefo - Oko K3 Akueteh  
 Masuzyo Mwale, Cosmas Ngandwe, Abel Ngoma and Edward Sakala - Nyau |-
! style="background:#EEDD82; width:50%" |Best Director
! style="background:#EEDD82; width:50%" |Best Documentary
|-
| valign="top" |
 Ramsey Nouah - Rattlesnake: The Ahanna Story
 Bolanle Austen-Peters - Collision Course  Ekene Som Mekwunye - Light In The Dark  Hamisha Daryani Ahuja - Namaste Wahala Izu Ojukwu - Amina  Mildred Okwo - La Femme Anjola  
 Robert O. Peters - Voiceless | valign="top" |
 Saitabao Kaiyare, Mumo Liku, Elena Schilling, Daniella Fritz, Ann Katrina Boberg - If Objects Could Speak
 Allen Onyige - Sunset in Makoko  Eugene Mbugua - This Love  Femi Odugbemi - Unmasked: Leadership, Trust and The Covid 19 Pandemic in Nigeria  Lawrence Adejumo - Streets of Lagos: Dear Little People  
 Taiwo Adeyemi - Road2blow |-
! style="background:#EEDD82; width:50%" |Best Online Social Content Creator
! style="background:#EEDD82; width:50%" |Best Africa Magic Original Drama Series
|-
| valign="top" |
  Oga Sabinus- Mr Funny
 Bukunmi Adeaga-Ilori - Kayamata  Edem Victor - First Date – Mummy’s Boy  Elozonam Ogbolu - Affiah-De Ja Vu  Jacqueline Suowari - Of Line and Layers  Mr Macaroni - Multi Personality Disorder  
 Taaooma - Road Rage  Tee Kuro - Nollywood Epic Love Story 1& 2-Parody | valign="top" |
 Dimbo Atiya - Rishante 
 Femi Odugbemi - Movement: Japa  James Omokwe - Riona  Tosin Igho & Rogba Arimoro - Venge  Uche Ikejimba - Unmarried  Uche Ikejimba - Dilemma  Victor Sanchez Aghahowa - Enakhe  Winifred Nwokedi - Eve |-
! style="background:#EEDD82; width:50%" |Best Africa Magic Original Comedy Series
! style="background:#EEDD82; width:50%" |Best Dressed Male
|- 
| valign="top" |
 Rogers Ofime - The Johnsons
 Bright Okpocha and Solomon Adekunle - My Flatmates  Funke Akindele Bello and JJC Skillz - My Siblings & I | valign="top" |
 Denola Grey
|-
! style="background:#EEDD82; width:50%" |Best Dressed Female
! style="background:#EEDD82; width:50%" |Industry Merit Award 
|-
|
 Osas Ighodaro
|
 Taiwo Ajayi-Lycett
|-
! style="background:#EEDD82; width:50%" |Trailblazer Award
! style="background:#EEDD82; width:50%" |Longest running TV show in Africa
|-
|
 Teniola Aladese
|
 Tinsel|}''

References 

Entertainment events in Nigeria
2022 in Nigerian cinema
Africa Magic
21st century in Lagos
Africa Magic Viewers' Choice Awards ceremonies